Vangelis Koutsoures (born on 2 February 1975) is a Greek football player who currently plays for Erani Filiatra. Koutsoures played for Panathinaikos F.C., OFI Crete and Kerkyra F.C. in the Greek Super League.

References 

Greek footballers
Kalamata F.C. players
A.O. Kerkyra players
Panetolikos F.C. players
OFI Crete F.C. players
Iraklis Thessaloniki F.C. players
Edessaikos F.C. players
Panathinaikos F.C. players
Living people
1975 births
Association football midfielders
Footballers from Moudania